Bierné is a former commune in the Mayenne department in northwestern France. On 1 January 2019, it was merged into the new commune Bierné-les-Villages.

Population

See also
Communes of Mayenne

References

Former communes of Mayenne